Series 18 of British television drama The Bill consisted of 86 episodes, broadcast between 3 January and 31 December 2002. This series marked a massive change for the show, after it received a new executive producer, Paul Marquess. Series 18 became the first series to be broadcast in serial format, and generally, only one episode was broadcast per week. The style of the programme also noticeably changes, becoming less police procedural and more "soap opera". This meant that the personal lives of characters were regularly explored for the first time, meaning several characters had family members or partners introduced, casting that rarely happened prior to the Marquess era.

The show also dropped on-screen titles for the first time in the show's history, the last of which being the episode 'Quinnan: Part 6'. That six-part plot led to the departure of long serving character, PC Dave Quinnan,  as actor Andrew Paul exited the series after 12 years. Unlike Paul, who left voluntarily, many of the early departures were enforced as Marquess dismissed a total of eight characters to make way for a major revamp of the cast as part of the move to a soap-opera style series. The longest serving dismissals were that of Andrew Monroe & Derek Conway, with both Colin Tarrant & Ben Roberts sacked after 12 & 14 years on the show, respectively. Their departure came as part of the events around the second station fire, producers following the same format as the 1990 fire by staging a fire to account for a set redevelopment. The events of the fire, which killed six cast members, were preceded by the murder of Conway in a petrol bomb attack. This led to the second major cast change on the series in as many years, following the Don Beech fiasco that saw CID disbanded in 2000. While the decision to remove a large number of long-term characters was controversial amongst die-hard fans, the dramatic scenes from the fire and its related episodes saw a rise in viewership after it dropped prior to Marquess' introduction. The series also made history by airing its first on-screen gay kiss, and while it led to some 170 complaints, they were all dismissed by the Independent Television Committee, who deemed the scene was not "sexually explicit".

In addition to the station fire, two other characters were killed off in major storylines that spanned a majority of the series; Superintendent Tom Chandler's past was explored in a six-month plot that led to his downfall and suicide, while PC Cass Rickman was murdered by a serial killer in a plot that lasted seven months, which did not conclude until the first episodes of the following series. In addition to SC Terry Knowles getting killed in the first episode of the series, part of a plot continued from series 17, the show had the most character deaths in a single series during the show's 27-year run with ten. At that point, it was more than the total number of characters killed off in the series' history. Between the pilot in 1983 and 2001, just nine characters were killed off.

On 14 August 2013, The Bill Series 18 Part 1 & 2 and The Bill Series 18 Part 3 & 4 DVD sets were released (in Australia).

Cast changes

Arrivals
 PC Cathy Bradford (Set in Stone-)
 DC Eva Sharpe (At the Deep End-)
 PC Gary Best (Vigilante-)
 DC Ken Drummond (Ruffled Feathers-)
 Insp. Gina Gold (Ruffled Feathers-)
 PC Luke Ashton - returning character (Prove Your Worth-)
 TDC Brandon Kane (Prove Your Worth-)
 PC Kerry Young (Too Close to the Window-)
 DS Phil Hunter (First Day Collar-)
 FDO Roberta Cryer (Loggerheads-)
 DS Samantha Nixon (Tactful Approach-)
 PC Gemma Osbourne (Game Over-)
 Supt. Adam Okaro (Lock and Load Part 2-)
 PC Ruby Buxton (First Day Blues-)

Departures
 SC Terry Knowles - Stabbed to death during a traffic stop
 PC Dave Quinnan - Follows through his transfer to SO10 after PC Polly Page rejects his marriage proposal
 Ch. Insp. Derek Conway - Killed in petrol bomb attack by Jeff Simpson
 DS Vik Singh - Resigns rather than be suspended and face the consequences for assaulting Jeff Simpson
 Insp. Andrew Monroe - Killed in station fire
 PC Ben Hayward - Killed in station fire
 PC Di Worrell - Killed in station fire
 DC Paul Riley - Killed in station fire
 DC Kate Spears - Dies in hospital following station fire
 PC Polly Page - Sent on long-term leave after suicide attempt (temporary departure)
 PC Sam Harker - Dies in hospital following station fire
 DI Alex Cullen - Transfers to MIT
 Supt. Tom Chandler - Commits suicide before being arrested for rape
 PC Cass Rickman - Murdered by the Sun Hill Serial Killer - Pat Kitson

Episodes
</onlyinclude>

References

2002 British television seasons
The Bill series